The Chippewa River is a stream in Michigan, United States, that runs  through the central Lower Peninsula. The Chippewa is a tributary of the Tittabawassee River and is thus part of the Saginaw River drainage basin. The river is named after the Chippewa people (the Saginaw Chippewa Tribal Nation is located in Isabella County).

Description
The main stem of the river begins in northeast Mecosta County in the village of Barryton at  where the north and west branches are impounded. The West Branch Chippewa River rises as the outflow of Tubbs Lake, part of a complex of lakes formed by Winchester Dam several miles southwest of Barryton.

The Winchester Dam, built in 1954, impounds  and forms the Martiny Lake Flooding. The dam, which is owned by the State of Michigan, is identified as a "significant hazard due to its proximity to the Village of Barryton." An 1879 atlas of Mecosta County gives an indication of the area's geography before the dam was built. Several of the lakes that now form lobes in a continuous body of water are clearly seen as separate lakes, some with different names or spellings. Tubbs Lake is called "Tebbs Lake" and Diamond Lake is "Dimon Lake".

The river flows through Mt. Pleasant and is the focal point of four parks in the city: Millpond Park, Nelson Park, Chipp-A-Water, and Island Park. In Island Park, the river flows completely around the park and creates a natural island in the center of the city. Three additional Isabella County parks utilize the river for recreation: Meridian Park, Deerfield Nature Park, and Majeski Landing.

The river flows east into Midland County where it is joined by the Pine River at the Chippewa Nature Center in Homer Township, then joins the Tittabawassee River in downtown Midland under The Tridge.

The river flows with a mean discharge rate of 254 cubic feet per second (7.19 cubic meters per second) at its gauge near Mount Pleasant. It is locally known for bass fishing. Chubs and redhorses are also abundant.  There are two canoe liveries on the river: Chippewa River Outfitters and Buckley's Mountainside Canoe Livery. The liveries offer canoe, kayak, and tubing trips for a few hours to all day, even an overnight camping trip. The river flows through a gravel pit named Hubsher Gravel Pit. The river is a main water source for the city of Mount Pleasant.

Tributaries and features 
From the mouth:
 (left) Pine River
 See Pine River for tributaries of the Pine River
 (right) Dice Drain
 (left) Wilson Drain
 (right) Huber Drain
 (left) Baker Drain
 (left) Hoxie Drain
 (left) Little Salt Creek, also known as Little Salt River
 (left) Turkey Creek
 (right) Frost Drain
 (left) Salt Creek, also known as Little Salt Creek, Little Salt River, Salt River
 (left) Kirch Drain
 (right) Thrasher Creek
 (right) Black Creek
 (right) Potter Creek
 (right) Onion Creek
 (right) Childs Creek
 (left) LaStrange Lake
 Lyons Lake
 (left) Mud Lake
 (left) Figg Drain
 (left) Parcher Drain
 (right) Wyant Drain
 (right) Mission Creek
 (right) North Branch Chippewa River
 (left) Hogg Creek
 (left) Hagerman Drain
 (left) Schofield Creek
 (right) Stevenson Lake
 Owens Lake
 Deadman Swamp
 Grass Lake
 (left)Johnson Creek
 Peas Lake
 Wing Lake
 (left) Cedar Creek
 (left) Stony Brook
 Woodruff Lake
 (right) Coldwater River
 See Coldwater River for tributaries of the Coldwater River
 Lake Isabella
 (left) Squaw Creek
 Long Pond
 (left) Indian Creek
 Indian Lake
 (left) Six Lakes
 Long Lake
 Round Lake
 Hoffman Lake
 Strong Lake
 Bamber Creek
 Hannah Lake
 Moiles Lake
 Markel Lake
 Randall Lake
 (left) Tanner Creek
 (right) Sherman Creek
 (left) West Branch Chippewa River
 (right) Brown Creek
 (right) Helmer Creek
 Winchester Dam forming the Martiny Lake Flooding 
 Tubbs Lake
 Lost Lake
 Diamond Lake
 Big Evans Lake
 Roundy Branch
 Hills Lake
 Pine Lake
 Upper Evans Lake
 Manake Lake
 Lower Evans Lake
 Chippewa Creek
 Chippewa Lake
 Long Lake
 Saddlebag Lake
 Bullhead Lake
 Boom Lake
 Bass Lake
 Dogfish Lake
 Halfmoon Lake
 Mud Lake
 (right) North Branch Chippewa River
 (left) Rattail Creek
 Rattail Lakes
 (right) Butts Creek
 (right) Benjamin Creek
 (left) Merrill Lake
 (right) Tubs Lake
 (right) Atkinson Creek
 Big Cranberry Lake
 Mystic Lake
 Crooked Lake
 Three Lake Creek
 Three Lake

Drainage basin 
(Including the Pine River)

 Clare County
 Garfield Township
 Surrey Township
 Gratiot County
 City of Alma
 Arcada Township
 Bethany Township
 Emerson Township
 Pine River Township
 City of St. Louis
 Seville Township
 Sumner Township
 New Haven Township
 Newark Township
 Wheeler Township

 Isabella County
 Broomfield Township
 Chippewa Township
 Coe Township
 Coldwater Township
 Deerfield Township
 Fremont Township
 Gilmore Township
 Isabella Township
 Lincoln Township
 City of Mount Pleasant
 Nottawa Township
 Rolland Township
 Village of Shepherd
 Sherman Township
 Union Township
 Vernon Township

 Mecosta County
 Chippewa Township
 Fork Township
 Martiny Township
 Millbrook Township
 Sheridan Township
 Wheatland Township
 Midland County
 Greendale Township
 Homer Township
 Jasper Township
 Lee Township
 City of Midland
 Midland Township
 Mount Haley Township
 Porter Township

 Montcalm County
 Ferris Township
 Home Township
 Richland Township
 Osceola County
 Orient Township

References

External links

 USGS Water Data
 Isabella County Park Information

Rivers of Michigan
Rivers of Isabella County, Michigan
Rivers of Midland County, Michigan
Rivers of Mecosta County, Michigan
Rivers of Clare County, Michigan
Tributaries of Lake Huron